Kill the Rhythm (Like a Homicide) is the sixth album by old school hip hop/hardcore rapper Just-Ice, it was released in 1995.

Track listing
"Bad Boy Back (In Town)"
"Bring ’Em Back Alive"
"Ladies ’Nuff Respect"
"Keep it Real"
"Stay the Hell away from Me!"
"Cenci"
"Livin' in Lockdown"
"Freestyle No. 1"
"Freestyle No. 2"
"It's On"
"Kill the Rhythm (Like a Homicide)"

References

1995 albums
Just-Ice albums